The Kodava (Kodava takk, meaning 'speech of Kodavas', in the Kodava language, alternate name: Coorgi, Kodagu) is an endangered Dravidian language and it is spoken in Kodagu district in Southern Karnataka, India. The term Kodava has two related usages. Firstly, it is the name of the Kodava language and culture followed by a number of communities from Kodagu. Secondly, within the Kodava-speaking communities and region (Kodagu), it is a demonym for the dominant Kodava people. Hence, the Kodava language is not only the primary language of the Kodavas but also of many other castes and tribes in Kodagu. The language has two dialects: Mendele (spoken in Northern and Central Kodagu, i.e. outside Kodagu's Kiggat naadu) and Kiggat (spoken in Kiggat naadu, in Southern Kodagu).

Historically, it has been referred to as a dialect of Centmil, in some Tamil texts the Kodagu language is referred to as Kudakan Tamil. However it has been re-analysed as a language by early 20th century academics. Now it is considered as an intermediate language between Kannada, Malayalam, Tamil, and Tulu in comparative linguistics.

It is traditionally written using the Thirke script which is an abugida. The 2011 Census of India reports 96,918 persons who returned Kodava as their mother tongue and 16,939 for Coorgi/Kodagu, for a total of 113,857 persons who identified one of these languages as their mother tongue.

History 
In Kannada, the region was called Kodagu and the people Kodaga. Natively, the people were called Kodava and the land was called Kodavu in the folksongs. Comparative Dravidian studies show that the Kodava language belongs to the South Dravidian language group.

Grammar 
The grammar of Kodagu has been systematically studied and documented since at least around 1867 when Captain R.A. Cole published the seminal work An Elementary Grammar of the Coorg Language.

Phonology

Vowels 
Dravidian vowel systems contain five vowel qualities i.e. those usually corresponding to a, e, i, o and u., with a short and long variants for each. However, Kodava has two more: the mid and high (close) back unrounded vowels, with corresponding long variants.

Kodagu has 14 vowels. 7 of these, i, e, ɛ, a, ɑ, o, u, have long equivalents.

Consonants 
Kodava has 25 consonants.

Kodava and Kannada share a lack of palatalization of word-initial *k-, which is a feature found in the Tamil-Malayalam branch.

Writing system 
The Coorgi is an alphabet developed by the linguist Gregg M. Cox that is used by a number of individuals within Kodagu district of India to write the endangered Dravidian language of Kodava, also known sometimes as Coorgi.

The script uses a combination of 26 consonant letters, eight vowel letters and a diphthong marker. Each letter represents a single sound and there are no capital letters. A computer-based font has been created.

The script was developed out of the request by a group of Kodava individuals to have a distinct script for Kodava Takk, to distinguish the language. Kodava Takk is generally written in the Kannada script, but can also be found written in the Malayalam script, especially along the borders with Kerala. The new script is intended as a unified writing system for all Kodava Takk speakers.

Comparisons

Linguistically, Kodava/Kodagu language belongs to the South Dravidian subfamily of the Dravidian family. Further within the South Dravidian subfamily , it belongs to the subgroup Tamil-Malayalam-Kodagu-Kota-Toda. It is closely related to and influenced by Kannada, Malayalam, Tamil and Tulu. A majority of the words are common between Kodava and Beary bashe, a dialect which is a mixture of Tulu and Malayalam spoken by the Beary Muslims and Kodava Thiyyar communities. Kodava is also closely related to the Kasaragod and Kannur dialects of Malayalam, which are in turn related to Beary.

Literature
Family histories, rituals and other records were scripted on palm leaves called Pattole (patt=palm, ole=leaf) by astrologers in the ancient times. When Kodava was written, it was usually with Kannada script, sometimes with minor modifications. The folk songs of the Kodavas, called the Palame (also known as the Balo Patt or Dudi Patt), were orally transmitted across several generations. The language had no significant written literature until the twentieth century. Appachcha Kavi, a playwright, and Nadikerianda Chinnappa, a folk compiler, are the two important poets and writers of the Kodava language. Other important writers in the language were B D Ganapathy and I M Muthanna. In 2005, after requests from the Kodagu community, German linguist Gerard Cox created a script unique to Kodava called the Coorgi-Cox script. It uses straight lines for 5 vowels, and has circles for diphthongs.

The Pattole Palame, a collection of Kodava folksongs and traditions compiled in the early 1900s by Nadikerianda Chinnappa, was first published in 1924. The most important Kodava literature, it is said to be one of the earliest, if not the earliest, collection of folklore of a community in an Indian language.  Nearly two-thirds of the book consists of folksongs that were handed down orally through generations, sung even today during marriage and death ceremonies and during festivals relating to the seasons and in honour of local deities and heroes. Traditionally known as Balo Pat, these songs are sung by four men who beat dudis (drums) as they sing. Kodava folk dances are performed to the beat of many of these songs. The Pattole Palame was written using the Kannada script originally; it has been translated into English by Boverianda Nanjamma and Chinnappa, grandchildren of Nadikerianda Chinnappa, and has been published by Rupa & Co., New Delhi.

Cinema
The Kodava Cinema industry is very small. A few movies portraying the native culture and traditions of the Kodavas have been produced in this language. The first Kodava film 'Nada Mann Nada Kool' was directed by S.R.Rajan and produced in the year 1972.

Words for family members

Kodava words

Recent developments
Since 2021, the Mangalore University now teaches an MA degree in the Kodava language.

References

Bibliography
 R A Cole, "An Elementary Grammar of the Coorg Language"

Further reading

External links
 Kodava Literature
 Kodava Samaj

Agglutinative languages
 
Dravidian languages
Languages of Karnataka
Endangered languages of India